Koel River may refer to the following two rivers in Jharkhand, India:
 South Koel River, a tributary of the Brahmani River
 North Koel River, a tributary of the Son River